Oreolalax lichuanensis (Lichuan lazy toad or Lichuan toothed toad) is a species of amphibian in the family Megophryidae. It is endemic to China, and found in south-central parts of the country (Hubei, Sichuan, Chongqing, and Guizhou).
Its natural habitats are subtropical or tropical moist montane forests, subtropical or tropical moist shrubland, and rivers.
It is threatened by habitat loss.

References

lichuanensis
Amphibians of China
Endemic fauna of China
Taxonomy articles created by Polbot
Amphibians described in 1979